The Eagle Awards were a series of awards for comic book titles and creators. They were awarded by UK fans voting for work produced during the previous year. Named after the UK's Eagle comic, they were launched in 1977 for comics released in 1976.

"[S]et up and financed by a group of dealers and fanzine editors" with the intention of including "people with... diverse interests... to make the poll as impartial as possible," the Eagles were described as "the first independent [in the UK], nationally organised comic art awards poll." The hope was that the Eagle Awards would "become a regular annual fandom event," and indeed, they were the preeminent British comics award in the 1980s and the 2000s (being mostly dormant in the 1990s), variously described as the country's comics equivalent of the Oscars or the BAFTAs. The Eagle Awards were usually presented in a ceremony at a British comic book convention; venues over the years included the British Comic Art Convention, UKCAC, Comic Festival, Comic Expo, and the London MCM Expo. Hosts for the ceremonies included such notables as Simon Pegg, Norman Lovett, Fraser Ayres, Billy West, and Anthony Stewart Head.

Initially the Eagle Award itself was a certificate; eventually the award became an engraved trophy.

Notable repeat Eagle Award winners included Alan Moore, who won the Favourite Comicbook Writer award an impressive eleven times (including sweeping the U.K. and U.S. categories in the period 1985–1987); Terry Austin, who won the Favourite Inker award nine times; Alex Ross, who won the Favourite Comics Artist (Fully Painted Artwork) seven times in ten possible years; and Laura DePuy Martin, who won the Favourite Colourist award six straight times. 2000 AD won the Favourite (Colour) Comic award 12 times, while The Walking Dead won Favourite Black & White Comicbook seven straight times. Batman was voted Favourite Comicbook Character 12 times and Judge Dredd won the award seven times; while the X-Men dominated the Favourite Comicbook Group or Team category, winning it eight times in the span of 11 years. Wolverine won the Favourite Comicbook Character category three times, the Favourite Supporting Character award three times, and the Character Most Worthy of Own Title twice.

In 2014, in connection with Stan Lee, the Eagle Awards were renamed, and presented as, the True Believer Comic Awards. They have not returned since then.

History

1977: conception and debut 

The Eagle Awards were set up by Mike Conroy, Nick Landau, Colin Campbell, Phil Clarke, and Richard Burton. Because the Eagle symbol was perceived (as described by Burton) as "a standard of quality ... seldom reached" in early 1977, the Eagle Awards were named "with official blessing from IPC" (Eagle's then-publisher).

The Eagles were launched at the British Comic Art Convention, the earliest British fan convention devoted entirely to comics (and usually known by the moniker Comicon). The first awards ceremony was held 3 September 1977, at the Bloomsbury Centre Hotel, London. The 1978 and 1979 awards were also presented at the British Comic Art Convention. Almost from the beginning, the awards included separate UK and US sections.

The 1980s: a Golden Age 
The 1980 Eagle Awards (for comics published in 1979) were sponsored by Burton, Conroy, Colin Campbell, Dark They Were and Golden Eyed, Steve Dillon, Forbidden Planet, Forever People, Nostalgia & Comics, Bob Smart, and Valhalla Books; and organised by Burton and Conroy. The 1981 edition was again organised by Burton and Conroy, and sponsored by Burton, Conroy, Colin Campbell, Forbidden Planet, Nostalgia & Comics, Bob Smart, and Comics Showcase. Marvel's X-Men comic and creators dominated the 1981 Eagles, winning Favourite Comic Book, Artist (John Byrne), Writer (Chris Claremont), Inker (Terry Austin), Character (Wolverine), Single Comic Book Story (X-Men #137, "The Fate of the Phoenix"), Continued Comic Book Story ("The Dark Phoenix Saga," X-Men #135–137), and Cover (X-Men #136, by Byrne and Austin). The 1981 awards were organised by Burton and Conroy, and sponsored by Burton, Conroy, Colin Campbell, Bob Smart, and four UK comics retailers: Forbidden Planet, Forever People, Nostalgia & Comics, and Comics Showcase.

After a hiatus in 1982, the Eagle Awards returned in 1983, presented at the London Comic Mart by Alan Moore and Dave Gibbons.

The 1984 Eagle Award nominations were announced in May with Howard Chaykin's American Flagg! dominating the nominations — Favourite Penciler, Inker, Writer, Comic, Character (Reuben Flagg), Supporting Character (Raul the cat), New Comic, Single or Continued Story, and two nominations for Favourite Cover — and winning seven of them. The 1984 awards presentation was at the Birmingham Comic Art Show.

By the mid-1980s the work of British authors often dominated both the UK and US categories. In 1985 Alan Moore won favorite writer in both categories, and in 1986 (presented on June 1 at the Birmingham Comic Art Show), the awards "proved to be a virtual clean sweep ... by Alan Moore," who not only again won "favourite writer in both the US and UK categories," but had his work win for favourite comic book, supporting character and new title in the US, and character, continuing story and "character worthy of own title" in the UK (in which last category his works held all top three spots).

The awards became almost fully annual in 1987, in conjunction with the United Kingdom Comic Art Convention (UKCAC); they were held at the UKCAC in 1987, 1988, and 1990.

The 1990s: a fallow period 
The Eagle Awards went dormant during most of the 1990s, as organizer Mike Conroy focused on his freelance writing (including becoming an editor of Comics International). From 1990 to 1997, the Eagles were replaced by the UK Comic Art Awards, and then from 1997 until 2003 (with the exception of the year 2000) were supplanted by the National Comics Awards.

The 2000s: a return to (hesitant) prominence 
In 2000, on the 50th anniversary of the birth of Eagle, the Eagle Awards returned. The ceremony was held April 22, 2000, at the Bristol Comic Festival (known as "Comics 2000"); this time MC'd by actor/comedian Simon Pegg. There were no Eagle Awards distributed in 2001; voting for comics published in 2000 ended in October 2001 and the winners were announced in June 2002 (at the Comic Festival, which had replaced UKCAC), so news reports announced these variously as the 2000, 2001, or 2002 Eagle Awards. The Eagles again went dormant in 2003 (replaced by the National Comics Awards).

The Eagle Awards returned in 2004 (sponsored by the retailer Ace Comics) and were presented at the inaugural Comic Expo, held November 6–7, at the Ramada City Inn in Bristol; the Eagles were again not presented in 2005.

The 2006–2008 awards presentations were held at the Comic Expo in Bristol, with the 2008 awards being notable for accusations of ballot-stuffing.

Management of the Eagle Awards was transferred from co-founder Mike Conroy to his teenage daughter Cassandra Conroy in 2009 (although Mike Conroy stayed on as advisor). The previous years' venue the Bristol Comic Expo scaled back that year, and was not available for the evening awards ceremony. After attempting to go forward with the Eagle Awards as an online-only process, the Conroys were forced to cancel the 2009 awards due to a "lack of nominations."

2010–2014: rifts, name changes, and demise 
The 2010–2012 awards were presented at the London MCM Expo. At the 2012 awards it was announced that the award would in future be called the MCM Award. The announcement prompted a public rift between MCM and the Conroys; as a result no Eagles were awarded in 2013.

The Conroys decided to continue the awards separate from MCM, and in April 2014 it was announced that the award would be presented at the London Film and Comic Con (LFCC) and be named The Stan Lee Eagle Award, with the backing of Stan Lee in his last European convention appearance. In June 2014, however, it was announced that the new award would be called the True Believer Comic Awards. The inaugural True Believer Comics Awards were presented July 12, 2014, at the LFCC, with host Anthony Stewart Head and a special appearance by Stan Lee. They have not been awarded since.

Dates and locations

Nominations and voting 
At the outset of the Eagle Award, ballots were made available to "most dealers, shops and fanzines." The initial method of casting votes was designed to be inclusive and straightforward, with completed forms able to be returned to the same place, rather than a centralised location. An initial ballot formed a list of nominees, from which the voting ballot was created and disseminated in the same manner.

The awards for 1983 used an open voting system, with no pre-selected nominees. In 1984, the Eagles introduced a new nomination system composed of "prominent British fans, publishers, dealers, and artists," which put forward three names in each category.

The 1986 Eagles saw the introduction of a "free vote . . . rather than pre-selected nominees," creating a "fairer reflection of fans' opinions — and some anomalous results, especially in the Roll of Honor category."

The 2004 awards saw online voting for the first time; over 13,000 voting forms were "received via post, email and website counting centres."

For the 2007 awards, nominations were made by the general comics-reading public via the Eagle Awards website; the five most popular became nominees for the awards.

Categories 
Over the course of their existence, the Eagle Awards were eventually awarded in more than 30 categories.

The first ballot had nominations in 19 categories:

 Favourite Comicbook Artist
 Favourite British Comics Artist
 Favourite Comicbook Writer — U.S.
 Favourite British Comics Writer
 Favourite Comicbook — Dramatic
 Favourite Comicbook — Humour
 Favourite Dramatic Black & White Comics Magazine
 Favourite Black & White Comicbook — Humour
 Favourite Comic Publication All Time
 Favourite Comicbook Character
 Favourite British Comic Character
 Favourite Comicbook Team
 Favourite New Comic Title
 Favourite Single Comicbook Story
 Favourite Continued Comic Story
 Favorite Professional British Comic Publication
 Favourite British Fan Publication
 Favourite British Fan Personality
 Favourite Comics Creator All Time

The next year's ballot, 1978, had 21 categories, dropping Favourite British Fan Personality and Favourite Comic Publication "All Time," and adding categories for Inker, Villain, and Supporting Character. The 1979 ballot dropped categories for Favourite Comic — Dramatic and Favourite Comic — Humour and added categories for Cover and Character Most Worthy of Own Title.

The nominations for Favourite Single Comicbook Story and Favorite Continued Comicbook Story were separate from 1977 to 1980 and then again from 2011 to 2014; they were merged as one category from 2000 to 2010. Similarly, the Favourite Cover category was only divided into British and American sections from 1984 to 1990.

Reflecting an interest in long-form comics, the Best Original Graphic Novel category was added in 1986. The Favourite Team category was dropped after 1990.

With the revival of the Eagles in 2000, categories for Favourite Writer and Favourite Artist were no longer separated into UK and US sections, and a host of new categories were added:
 Favourite Comics Artist — Fully Painted Artwork
 Favourite Colourist
 Favourite Comics Editor
 Favourite Black & White Comicbook
 Favourite British Small Press Title
 Favourite Trade Paperback/Reprint Collection
 Favourite Comic Strip/Newspaper Strip
 Favourite Comics-Based Movie or TV
 Favourite Comics Related Website
 Favourite Comics Related Website (fan-organised)
 Favourite Comics E-Zine

The Favourite Comics Related Website (Fan-Organized) category was dropped in 2002, but five more award categories were added:
 Favourite Comics Writer/Artist
 Favourite Manga Comic
 Favourite European Comic
 Favourite Comics-Related Book
 Favourite Web-based Comic

The 2004 Eagles dropped awards for the long-running categories Supporting Character and Character Most Worthy of Own Title, as well as the relatively new categories of British Small Press Title, Comic Strip/Newspaper Strip, and Comics E-Zine. It added a Favourite Letterer category as well as the one-off category Favourite Comics-Related Merchandise.

The 2006 Eagles saw the addition of a Favourite Publisher award, and the 2008 Eagle Awards added categories for Favourite Newcomer: Writer and Favourite Newcomer: Artist while dropping the long-running categories Favourite Character/Hero and Favourite Villain.

The final set of awards, in 2014, were given in 28 categories.

The following is a comprehensive list of the Eagle Award categories and the years they were presented, many of which were divided into British sections and (North) American sections. These categories included:

 Favourite Writer (1977–2014)
 Favourite Artist/Penciler (1977–2014)
 Favourite Comic/Colour Comicbook (1977–2014)
 Favourite Black & White Comicbook (2000–2014)
 Favourite New Title (1977–2014)
 Favourite Single or Continued Story (1977–2014) — divided into separate categories for Single and Continued 1977–1980, and 2011–2014
 Best Original Graphic Novel (1986–2014)
 Favourite Comic Strip/Newspaper Strip (2000–2004)
 Favourite Cover (1979–2014)
 Favourite Character/Hero (1977–2008)
 Favourite Villain (1978–2008) 
 Favourite Supporting Character (1978–2004)
 Character Most Worthy of Own Title (1979–2004)
 Favourite Specialist Comics Publication/Magazine About Comics (1977–2014)

General categories not divided into U.K. and U.S. sections were:
 Favourite Comics Writer/Artist (2002–2012)
 Favourite Inker (1978–2014)
 Favourite Comics Artist — Fully Painted Artwork (2000–2014)
 Favourite Colourist (2000–2014)
 Favourite Comics Letterer (2004–2014)
 Favourite Comics Editor (2000–2014)
 Favourite Publisher (2006–2014)
 Favourite Newcomer (1997)
 Favourite Newcomer: Writer (2008–2014)
 Favourite Newcomer: Artist (2008–2014)
 Favourite Comic: Dramatic (1977–1978)
 Favourite Comic: Humour (1977–1978)
 Favourite Black & White Comicbook - Humour (1977–1980)
 Favourite Comics Magazine (1977–1980)
 Favourite British Small Press Title (2000–2004) — specific to the U.K.
 Favourite Manga Comic (2002–2014)
 Favourite European Comic (2002–2014)
 Favourite Team (1977–1990) — divided into U.K./U.S. in 1985 only
 Favourite Trade Paperback/Reprint Collection (2000–2014)
 Favourite Comics-Related Book (2002–2014)
 Favourite Comics-Based Movie or TV (2000–2014)
 Favourite Comics Related Website (2000–2014)
 Favourite Comics E-Zine (2000–2004)
 Favourite Web-based Comic (2002–2014)
 Roll of Honour (1977–2014) — originally called "Favourite Comics Creator All Time"

Finally, there were a few one-off awards:
 Favourite British Fan Personality (1977)
 Favourite Comic Excluding North American and UK titles (2000) — became separate awards for Favourite Manga and Favourite European Comic
 Favourite Comics Related Website (fan-organised) (2000)
 Favourite Comics-Related Merchandise (2004)
 30th Anniversary Award for Outstanding Achievements in British Comics (2006)

Past winners 

 Listed by year presented

People

Favourite Comicbook Writer 
Alan Moore won this award an impressive eleven times (including sweeping the U.K. and U.S. categories in the period 1985–1987), with Chris Claremont winning it four times (all in the span 1977–1981).
 1977
U.K.: Chris Claremont 
U.S.: Roy Thomas
 1978
U.K.: Martin Lock
U.S.: Steve Englehart
 1979
 U.K.: T.B. Grover (pseudonym of John Wagner)
 U.S.: Chris Claremont
1980
U.K.: John Howard
U.S.: Chris Claremont
 1981
U.K.: T.B. Grover 
U.S. Chris Claremont
1983
 U.K.: Alan Moore
 U.S.: Frank Miller
1984
U.K.: Pat Mills
U.S.: Howard Chaykin
1985 (U.K. and U.S.) Alan Moore
1986 (U.K. and U.S.) Alan Moore
1987 (U.K. and U.S.) Alan Moore
 1988
 U.K.: Pat Mills
U.S.: Alan Moore
1989
 U.S.: Neil Gaiman (for The Sandman)
1990
U.K.: Grant Morrison
U.S.: Neil Gaiman, Sandman (DC)
2000 Alan Moore
2002 Alan Moore
2004 J. Michael Straczynski
2006 Grant Morrison
2007 Warren Ellis
2008 Alan Moore
2010 Warren Ellis
2011 Grant Morrison
2012 Scott Snyder
2014 Matt Fraction

Favourite Comics Writer/Artist 
Mike Mignola won this award three times while Frank Miller won it twice.
2002 Frank Miller
2004 Mike Mignola
2006 Howard Chaykin
2007 Mike Mignola
2008 Alan Davis
2010 Darwyn Cooke
2011 Mike Mignola
2012 Frank Miller

Favourite Comicbook Artist/Penciler
Multiple winners of this award included John Byrne, Brian Bolland, and Alan Davis with three wins; and Neal Adams, John Bolton, George Pérez, Bill Sienkiewicz, Frank Miller, Brian Talbot, Frank Quitely, and J. H. Williams III with two awards apiece.
 1977
 U.K.: Frank Bellamy
U.S.: Neal Adams
 1978
U.K.: John Bolton
U.S.: Neal Adams
 1979
 U.K.: John Bolton
 U.S.: John Byrne
1980
 U.K.: Brian Bolland
 U.S.:  John Byrne
1981
U.K.: Brian Bolland
U.S.: John Byrne
1983
U.K.: Brian Bolland
U.S.: Frank Miller
1984
U.S.: Howard Chaykin
1985
U.K.: Alan Davis
U.S. Bill Sienkiewicz
1986
 U.K.: Alan Davis
U.S.: George Pérez
 1987
U.K.: Alan Davis
U.S.: Frank Miller
1988
U.K.: Bryan Talbot
U.S.: Bill Sienkiewicz
1989 
U.K.: Bryan Talbot (for The Adventures of Luther Arkwright)
1990
U.K.: Simon Bisley
U.S.: Todd McFarlane
2000 George Pérez
2002 Frank Quitely
2004 Jim Lee
2006 Bryan Hitch
2007 John Cassaday
2008 Frank Cho
2010 Frank Quitely
2011 J. H. Williams III
2012 J. H. Williams III
2014 Fiona Staples

Favourite Inker
Terry Austin won this award nine times in an eleven-year span (from 1978 to 1988).
1978 Terry Austin
1979 Terry Austin
1980:
U.K.: Brian Bolland
U.S.: Terry Austin
1981 Terry Austin
1983 Terry Austin
1984 Howard Chaykin
1985 Terry Austin
1986 Terry Austin
1987 Terry Austin
1988 Terry Austin
1990 Paul Neary
2000 Jimmy Palmiotti
2002 Mark Farmer
2004 Scott Williams
2006 Jimmy Palmiotti
2007 Paul Neary
2008 D'Israeli (Matt Brooker)
2010 Kevin O'Neill
2011 Mike Mignola
2012 Scott Williams
2014 Becky Cloonan

Favourite Comics Artist (Fully Painted Artwork)
Alex Ross dominated this award, winning it seven times in 10 possible years.
2000 Alex Ross
2002 Alex Ross
2004 Alex Ross
2006 Alex Ross
2007 Alex Ross
2008 Alex Ross
2010 J. H. Williams III
2011 J. H. Williams III
2012 Alex Ross
2014 Fiona Staples

Favourite Colourist
Laura DePuy Martin won this award six straight times from 2000 to 2008.
2000 Laura DePuy
2002 Laura Depuy
2004 Laura Martin
2006 Laura Martin
2007 Laura Martin
2008 Laura Martin
2010 Ben Templesmith
2011 Dave Stewart
2012 Dave Stewart
2014 Matt Hollingsworth

Favourite Letterer
2006 Todd Klein
2007 Chris Eliopoulos
2008 Dave Gibbons
2010 Todd Klein
2011 Richard Starkings
2012 Richard Starkings/Comicraft
2014 Annie Parkhouse

Favourite Comics Editor
2000 AD's Tharg the Mighty won this award four times (with three of those awards going to Matt Smith); Axel Alonso also won the award three times.
2000 Dennis O'Neil
2002 Andy Diggle (Mighty Tharg: 2000 AD)
2004 Axel Alonso (Marvel Comics)
2006 Axel Alonso
2007 Matt Smith
2008 Tharg (Matt Smith)
2010 Axel Alonso
2011 Matt Smith/Tharg
2012 Karen Berger
2014 Chris Ryall

Best Newcomer 
1997 Alex Ronald

Award for Favourite Newcomer Writer/Rising Star
2008 Matt Fraction
2010 Jonathan Hickman
2011 Paul Cornell
2012 Jeff Lemire
2014 Matt Fraction

Award for Favourite Newcomer Artist/Rising Star
1978 Marshall Rogers 
2008 David Aja
2010 Jamie McKelvie
2011 Sara Pichelli
2012 Francesco Francavilla
2014 Fiona Staples

Works

Favourite (Colour) Comic
2000 AD was dominant in this category, winning 12 times; X-Men was in second place with six wins (five of them in the period 1977–1981).
1977 X-Men
1978 X-Men
1979
U.K.: 2000 AD
U.S.: X-Men
1980 
 U.K.: 2000 A.D.
 U.S.: X-Men
1981
U.K.: 2000 AD
U.S.: X-Men
1983
 U.K.: Warrior
 U.S.: Daredevil
1984
U.K.: The Daredevils
U.S.: American Flagg!
1985
U.K.: Warrior, edited by Dez Skinn (Quality Communications)
U.S.: Swamp Thing
1986
U.K.: 2000 AD
U.S.: Swamp Thing
1987
U.K.: 2000 AD
U.S.: Watchmen
1988
U.K.: 2000 AD
U.S.: Watchmen
1990
U.K.: 2000 AD
U.S.: Uncanny X-Men
2000
U.K.: 2000 AD
U.S.: Preacher, by Garth Ennis and Steve Dillon
2002
U.K.: 2000 AD
U.S.: JSA
2004
U.K.: Warhammer Monthly (Black Library)
U.S.: Fantastic Four (Marvel Comics)
2006
U.K.: Judge Dredd Megazine (Rebellion)
U.S.: The Ultimates Volume 2 (Marvel Comics)
2007 
U.K.: 2000 AD
U.S.: All-Star Superman
2008 
U.K.: The Spectacular Spider-Man
U.S.: Hellboy: Darkness Calls
2010
U.K.: 2000 AD
U.S.: Batman and Robin
2011
U.K.: 2000 AD
U.S.: Batman and Robin
2012
U.K.: Doctor Who Magazine
U.S.: Batman
2014
U.K.: 2000 AD
U.S.: Saga

Favourite Comic Magazine 
Savage Sword of Conan prevailed in this category three times in the five years it was awarded.
 1977 Savage Sword of Conan
 1978 Savage Sword of Conan
 1979 Savage Sword of Conan
 1980
 U.K.: 2000 AD Summer Special
 U.S.: Howard the Duck
 1981 Epic Illustrated

Favourite Comicbook - Humour
1977 Howard the Duck
1978 Howard the Duck

Favourite Black & White Comicbook - Humour
1977 Mad magazine

Favourite Black & White Comicbook
The Walking Dead won this category seven straight times.
2000 Hell and Back (A Sin City Love Story), by Frank Miller
2002 Liberty Meadows, by Frank Cho
2004 Bone (Cartoon Books)
2006 The Walking Dead (Image Comics)
2007 The Walking Dead
2008 The Walking Dead
2010 The Walking Dead
2011 The Walking Dead
2012 The Walking Dead
2014 The Walking Dead

Favourite UK Small Press Title/Black and White Comicbook 
2000 Kane by Paul Grist
2002 Jack Staff by Paul Grist (Dancing Elephant Press)
2004 Thrud the Barbarian (Carl Critchlow)
2006 Springheeled Jack (Black Boar Press)
2007 Hero Killers (Moonface Press)
2008 How to Date a Girl in Ten Days by Tom Humberstone
2010 Whatever Happened to The World's Fastest Man? by Dave West and Marleen Lowe
2011 Commando (D. C. Thomson & Co. Ltd)
2012 Viz (Dennis Publishing)
2014 Good Cop Bad Cop by Jim Alexander

Favourite Comic Album/Graphic Novel/Original Graphic Novel 
1986
U.K.: Nemesis Book III by Pat Mills and Kevin O'Neill
U.S.: American Flagg!: Hard Times by Howard Chaykin
1987
U.K.: D.R. & Quinch's Totally Awesome Guide to Life by Alan Moore and Alan Davis
U.S.: Batman: The Dark Knight Returns by Frank Miller and Klaus Janson
1988
U.K.: Violent Cases by Neil Gaiman and Dave McKean
U.S.: Daredevil: Love and War by Frank Miller and Bill Sienkiewicz
1989 Violent Cases by Neil Gaiman and Dave McKean
1990
U.K.: Sláine: The Horned God Book I by Pat Mills and Simon Bisley
U.S.: Arkham Asylum: A Serious House on Serious Earth by Grant Morrison and Dave McKean
2000 JLA: Earth 2 by Grant Morrison and Frank Quitely
2002 Safe Area Goražde by Joe Sacco
2004 Sgt. Rock: Between Hell and a Hard Place by Brian Azzarello and Joe Kubert
2006 Top 10: The Forty-Niners by Alan Moore and Gene Ha
2007 Pride of Baghdad by Brian K. Vaughan and Niko Henrichon
2008 The League of Extraordinary Gentlemen: Black Dossier by Alan Moore and Kevin O'Neill
2010 The League of Extraordinary Gentlemen, Volume III: Century by Alan Moore and Kevin O'Neill
2011 Scott Pilgrim, Volume 6: Scott Pilgrim’s Finest Hour by Bryan Lee O'Malley
2012 Batman: Noël by Lee Bermejo
2014 Avengers: Endless Wartime by Warren Ellis, et al.

Favourite Trade Paperback/Reprint Collection
2000 From Hell: To Hell, by Alan Moore and Eddie Campbell
2002 The Authority: Under New Management by Warren Ellis and Bryan Hitch
2004 The Chronicles of Conan (Dark Horse)
2006 Absolute Watchmen by Alan Moore and Dave Gibbons
2007 Absolute Sandman Volume 1 by Neil Gaiman
2008 Absolute Sandman Volume 2 by Neil Gaiman
2010 Captain Britain by Alan Moore and Alan Davis Omnibus
2011 Absolute All-Star Superman by Grant Morrison and Frank Quitely
2012 Thor Omnibus by Walt Simonson
2014 Hawkeye Volume 1 Oversized HC by Matt Fraction, et al.

Favourite New Comic Title
1977 Howard the Duck
1978 John Carter, Warlord of Mars
1979 Micronauts
1980 
 U.K.: Doctor Who Weekly
 U.S.: Howard the Duck
1981 The New Teen Titans
1983
 U.K.: Warrior
 U.S.: Camelot 3000
1984
U.S.: American Flagg!
1985
 U.K.: Captain Britain
 U.S.: Power Pack, written by Louise Simonson (Marvel Comics)
1986
U.K.: Captain Britain
U.S. Miracleman
1987
U.K.: Redfox
U.S.: Watchmen
1988
U.K.: The Adventures of Luther Arkwright
U.S.: Marshal Law
1989 
U.K.: The Adventures of Luther Arkwright
1990
U.K.: The Bogie Man
U.S.: Batman: Legends of the Dark Knight
2000 Top 10, by Alan Moore and Gene Ha
2002 Ultimate Spider-Man
2004 Conan (Dark Horse)
2006 All-Star Superman (DC) by Grant Morrison and Frank Quitely
2007 Nextwave
2008 Thor
2010 Batman and Robin
2011 Daytripper
2012 Batman
2014 Guardians of the Galaxy

Favourite Single or Continued Comicbook Story
1977
Single: Howard the Duck #3: "Four Feathers of Death" (Steve Gerber/John Buscema)
Continued: Master of Kung Fu #48-51 (Doug Moench/Paul Gulacy)
1978
Single: Avengers Annual #7 – The Final Threat (Jim Starlin)
Continued: Avengers Annual #7/Marvel Two-in-One Annual #2 (Jim Starlin)
1979
Single: X-Men #111 – Mindgames (Chris Claremont/John Byrne)
Continued: The Avengers #167, 168, 170-177 (Jim Shooter/George Pérez, Sal Buscema, David Wenzel)
1980
 U.K.:
 Single: Hulk Weekly #2 (Night Raven)
 Continued: Hulk Weekly 1–30, 42, 43 (Black Knight)
 U.S.:
Single: Iron Man #128 – Demon in a Bottle (David Michelinie, Bob Layton/John Romita Jr.)
Continued: X-Men #125-128 (Chris Claremont/John Byrne)
1981
U.K. 
Single: "Terror Tube," 2000 AD #167
Continued: "The Judge Child," 2000 AD #156–181
U.S.
Single: X-Men #137 "The Fate of the Phoenix"
Continued: X-Men #135–137, "The Dark Phoenix Saga"
 1983
 U.K.: Marvelman (Warrior #1-3, 5, & 6)
 U.S.: Wolverine #1-4 (limited series)
1984
U.S.: American Flagg! #1–2, "Hard Times"
1985
U.K.:  2000 AD #355–359
U.S.: Superman #400
1986
U.K.: Halo Jones Book Two (2000 AD #406-415)
U.S.: Crisis on Infinite Earths #1-9
1987
U.K.: Halo Jones Book Three
U.S.: Batman: The Dark Knight Returns
1988
U.K.: Zenith (2000 AD #535-550)
U.S.: Batman #404-407: Year One
1990
U.K.: Sláine: The Horned God Book I (2000 AD #626-635)
U.S.: Skreemer (limited series)
2000 Daredevil (#1-8), by Kevin Smith and Joe Quesada
2002 The Authority: The Nativity
2004 Daredevil #46-50: Hardcore (Brian Michael Bendis & Alex Maleev)
2006 The Ultimates volume 2 #1-9 (Mark Millar, Bryan Hitch, and Paul Neary)
2007 Nextwave #1-6
2008 Captain America #25-30: The Death of Captain America
2010 
Single: Phonogram: The Singles Club #4: "Konichiwa Bitches"
Continued: The Walking Dead #61-65: "Fear The Hunters"
2011
Single: Daytripper #8
Continued: The Walking Dead #73-79: "Too Far Gone"
2012
Single: Doctor Who #12
Continued: Walking Dead #79-84: "No Way Out"
2014
Single: "Pizza is my Business," Hawkeye #11
Continued: Saga

Favourite Cover
1979 Master of Kung Fu #67 (Paul Gulacy)
1980
 U.K.: 2000 AD 144
 U.S.: The Avengers #185 (George Pérez)
1981
U.K.: 2000 AD #173 (Brian Bolland)
U.S.: X-Men #136 (John Byrne/Terry Austin)
1983
 U.K.: Warrior #7 (Mick Austin)
 U.S.: Doctor Strange #55 (Michael Golden)
1985
U.K.: Warrior #19 (David Lloyd/Garry Leach)
U.S.: New Mutants #22 (Bill Sienkiewicz)
1986
U.K.: Captain Britain #6 (Alan Davis)
U.S.: Swamp Thing #34 (John Totleben)
1987
U.K.: 2000 AD #500 (multiple artists)
U.S.: Batman: The Dark Knight Returns #1 (Frank Miller/Klaus Janson)
1988
U.K.: The Adventures of Luther Arkwright #1 (Bryan Talbot)
U.S.:  Wonder Woman #10 (George Pérez)
1989 
U.K.: The Adventures of Luther Arkwright (Bryan Talbot)
1990
U.K.: 2000 AD Prog 626 (Simon Bisley)
U.S.: Aliens #1 (Denis Beauvais)
2000 Batman: Harley Quinn (Alex Ross)
2002 Ultimate Spider-Man #1 (Joe Quesada)
2004 JLA: Liberty and Justice (Alex Ross)
2006 All-Star Superman #1 (Frank Quitely)
2007 Fables: 1001 Nights of Snowfall (James Jean)
2008 World War Hulk 1A (David Finch)
2010 Batman and Robin #4 (Frank Quitely)
2011 Batwoman #0 (J.H. Williams III)
2012 Batwoman #1 (J.H. Williams III)
2014 Hawkeye #9 (David Aja)

Favourite Comic (excluding North American and UK titles)
1990 Akira (Japan)
2000 Bacchus, by Eddie Campbell (Australia)

Favourite Manga Comic
2002 Lone Wolf and Cub
2004 Blade of the Immortal (Dark Horse)
2006 Blade of the Immortal (Dark Horse)
2007 Blade of the Immortal
2008 Death Note
2010 Fullmetal Alchemist
2011 Fullmetal Alchemist
2012 20th Century Boys

Favourite European Comic
2002 Metabarons (Les Humanoïdes Associés, France)
2004 Tex (Sergio Bonelli Editore, Italy)
2006 Asterix and the Falling Sky (Albert Rene Editions, France)
2007 Asterix and the Vikings (France)
2008 Requiem, Vampire Knight (Nickel Editions, France)
2010 Requiem Chevalier Vampire (France)
2011 Blacksad (Dargaud, France)
2012 Dylan Dog (Sergio Bonelli Editore, Italy)

Favourite Newspaper Strip
2000 Peanuts
2002 Liberty Meadows
2004 Mutts (Patrick McDonnell)

Favourite Comic Strip in a UK Comic or Magazine
2000 Judge Dredd (2000 AD/Judge Dredd Megazine)
2002 Nikolai Dante (2000 AD)
2004 Judge Dredd (2000 AD/Judge Dredd Megazine – Rebellion)

Favourite Web-Based Comic
2000 Astounding Space Thrills by Steve Conley
2002 Sluggy Freelance by Pete Abrams
2004 PvP by Scott Kurtz
2006 Supernatural Law by Batton Lash
2007 Penny Arcade by Jerry Holkins and Mike Krahulik
2008 The Order of the Stick by Rich Burlew
2010 FreakAngels by Warren Ellis and Paul Duffield
2011 Axe Cop by Malachai Nicolle and Ethan Nicolle
2012 Freakangels
2014 Aces Weekly by David Lloyd, et al. (www.acesweekly.co.uk)

Favourite Publisher
2006 DC Comics
2007 Marvel Comics
2008 Marvel Comics
2010 DC Comics/Vertigo Comics
2011 DC Comics/Vertigo/WildStorm
2012 DC Comics/Vertigo
2014 IDW Publishing

Characters

Favourite Comicbook Character
Batman won this category 12 times; Judge Dredd won seven times, and Wolverine won it three times.
1977
 U.K.: Captain Britain
U.S.: Conan the Barbarian
1978
 U.K.: Judge Dredd
U.S.: Batman
1979
 U.K.: Judge Dredd
 U.S.: Batman
1980
U.K.: Judge Dredd
U.S.: Wolverine
1981
U.K.: Judge Dredd
U.S.: Wolverine
1983
 U.K.: Marvelman
 U.S.: Wolverine
1985
U.K.: Judge Dredd
U.S.: Reuben Flagg
1986
 U.K.: Halo Jones
 U.S.: Batman
1987
U.K.: Judge Dredd
U.S.: Batman
1988
U.K.: Luther Arkwright
U.S.: Batman
1989 
U.K.: Luther Arkwright
1990
U.K.: Judge Dredd
U.S.: Batman
2000 Batman
2002 Batman
2004 Batman
2006 Batman
2007 Batman
2008 Batman

Favourite Villain
DC's The Joker won this category five times, 2000 AD's Torquemada won four times, and Marvel's Magneto came away with three wins. 
1978 Thanos
1979 Magneto
1980
 U.K.: Judge Cal
 U.S.: Magneto
1981
U.K.: Judge Death
U.S.: Magneto
 1983
 U.K.: Kid Marvelman
 U.S.: Darkseid
1985
U.K.: Torquemada, from Nemesis the Warlock (2000 AD), by Pat Mills and Brian Talbot (Fleetway)
U.S.: Doctor Doom
1986
U.K.: Torquemada
U.S.: Anti-Monitor
1987
U.K.: Torquemada
U.S.: The Joker
1988
U.K.: Torquemada
U.S.: The Joker
1990
U.K.: Judge Death
U.S.: The Joker
2000 Herr Starr (Preacher)
2002 Lex Luthor (Superman)
2004 Doctor Doom (Fantastic Four – Marvel Comics)
2006 The Joker
2007 Dirk Anger (Nextwave: Marvel Comics|)
2008 The Joker

Favourite Supporting Character
1978 Pip the Troll
1979 Wolverine
1980
 U.K.: Ro-Jaws
 U.S.: Wolverine
1981
U.K.: Hoagy (Robo-Hunter)
U.S.: Wolverine
1983
 U.K.: Zirk (Warrior)
 U.S.: Elektra
1984
U.S.:  Raul the cat (American Flagg!)
1985
U.K.: Evey (V for Vendetta)
U.S.: Raul the cat (American Flagg!)
1986 
U.K.: Meggan (Captain Britain)
U.S.: John Constantine (Swamp Thing)
1987
U.K.: Ukko the Dwarf (Sláine)
U.S.: John Constantine
1988
U.K.: Ukko the Dwarf
U.S.: Abigail Arcane Cable
1990 
U.K.: Middenface McNulty (Strontium Dog)
2000 Oracle/Barbara Gordon (Batman/Birds of Prey)
2002 Commissioner James Gordon (Batman)
2004 Mary Jane Watson (Spider-Man – Marvel Comics)

Character Most Worthy of Own Title
1978 Silver Surfer
1979 Silver Surfer
1980 
 U.K.: Judge Dredd
 U.S.: Warlock
1981
U.K.: Judge Dredd
U.S.: Silver Surfer
1983
 U.K.: Judge Anderson
 U.S.: The Spectre
1985
U.K.: D.R. & Quinch
U.S.: The Spectre
1986
U.K.: Halo Jones
U.S.: Wolverine
1987
U.K.: Captain Britain
U.S.: Wolverine
1988
U.K.: Halo Jones
U.S.: Rorschach
1990
U.K.: Captain Britain
2000 Luther Arkwright (Heart of Empire)
2002 Elijah Snow (Planetary)
2004 Doctor Strange (Marvel Comics)

Favourite Comicbook Group or Team
The X-Men dominated this category, winning it eight times in the span of 11 years.
1977 X-Men
1978 X-Men
1979 X-Men
1980 
 U.K.: Ro-Busters
 U.S.: X-Men
1981 X-Men
1983 X-Men
1985
U.K.: Mega City Judges
U.S.: Teen Titans
1986 X-Men
1987 X-Men
1988 Justice League International
1990 Doom Patrol

Comics Press & Media

Favourite Specialist Comics Publication/Trade Publication 
Multiple award-winners in this category included Wizard with six wins, Fantagraphics Books with its publications  Amazing Heroes and The Comics Journal racking up seven wins in total, and the British publication Speakeasy with four wins.
1977
Pro: House of Hammer
Fan: Comic Media News
1978
Pro: Starburst
Fan: Comic Media News
 1980
U.K. (fan): BEM
U.S. (fan): The Comics Journal
1981
U.K.: BEM
U.S.: The Comics Journal
1985
U.K.: Fantasy Advertiser
U.S.: Amazing Heroes
1986
 U.K.: Speakeasy
U.S.: Amazing Heroes
1987
 U.K.: Speakeasy
U.S.: Amazing Heroes
1988
 U.K.: Speakeasy
U.S.: Amazing Heroes
1990
U.K.: Speakeasy
U.S.: Marvel Age
2000 Wizard
2002 Wizard
2004 The Comics Journal (Fantagraphics Books)
2006 The Comics Journal (Fantagraphics Books)
2007 Wizard
2008 Wizard
2010 Wizard
2011 Wizard
2012 DC Comics Super Hero Collection
2014 Bleeding Cool

Favourite Comics-Related Book
2002 The Amazing Adventures of Kavalier and Clay, by Michael Chabon
2004 Mythology: The DC Comics Art of Alex Ross by Chip Kidd with Geoff Spear
2006 Eisner/Miller (edited by Charles Brownstein & Diana Schutz)
2007 Making Comics: Storytelling Secrets of Comics, Manga and Graphic Novels by Scott McCloud (HarperCollins)
2008 Our Gods Wear Spandex by Christopher Knowles
2010 The Insider's Guide to Creating Comics and Graphic Novels by Andy Schmidt
2011 75 Years of DC Comics by Paul Levitz (Taschen)
2012 Supergods: Our World in the Age of the Superhero by Grant Morrison
2014 The Secret History of Marvel Comics: Jack Kirby and the Moonlighting Artists at Martin Goodman's Empire by Blake Bell and Michael J. Vassallo

Favourite Comics Related Website (professional)
Comic Book Resources was a repeat winner in this category, with five wins in 14 years.
2000 Comic Book Resources
2002 Comic Book Resources
2004 Comicon.com
2006 Silver Bullet Comic Books
2007 Newsarama
2008 Marvel.com
2010 Comic Book Resources
2011 Comic Book Resources
2012 Bleeding Cool
2014 Comic Book Resources

Favourite Comics Related Website (fan-organised)
2000 Sequential Tart

Favourite Comics E-Zine
2002 Comic Book Electronic Magazine
2004 Newsarama

Favourite Comics-based Film or TV Series
2000 Batman Beyond
2004 X2 (Bryan Singer, director)
2006 Batman Begins (Christopher Nolan, director)
2007 Heroes
2008 300
2010 Watchmen
2011 Scott Pilgrim vs. the World
2012 The Big Bang Theory
2014 Iron Man 3

Favourite British Fan Personality 
 1977 Martin Lock

Favourite Comics-Related Merchandise
2004 Kingdom Come action figures (DC Select; second series)

Special awards

Favourite Comic Publication "All Time" 
 1977 Fantastic Four

Roll of Honour
1977 Stan Lee
1978 Steve Englehart
1979 Jack Kirby
1980 Roy Thomas
1981 Jerry Siegel and Joe Shuster
1982 Mick Austin
1983 Will Eisner
1985 Steve Ditko
1986 Alan Moore
1987 Frank Miller
1988 Pat Mills
1990 2000 AD
2000 Gil Kane
2002 Joe Quesada
2004 Neil Gaiman
2006 Grant Morrison
2007 Warren Ellis
2008 Mike Mignola
2010 Brian Bolland
2011 Dave Gibbons
2012 Frank Quitely
2014 Gail Simone

See also
List of comics awards
Alley Award
Bill Finger Award
Eisner Awards
Harvey Awards
Inkpot Award
Kirby Awards
National Comics Awards
Russ Manning Award
Shazam Awards

Notes

Citations

References
List of all winners, 1977–2011 at the official Eagle Awards website, archived at The Wayback Machine
List of 2004's winners at Comicsbulletin.com
 Eagle Awards at the Comic Book Awards Almanac website, archived at  Wayback Machine
 Stan Lee Eagle Awards homepage archived at the Wayback Machine
True Believer Comic Awards website homepage archived at the Wayback Machine
 Stringer, Lew. "Conventions of the Past - Part 1," Blimey! The Blog of British Comics (May 5, 2009) — information about the 1984 Eagles

External links
Eagle Awards website homepage archived at the Wayback Machine

Comics awards
1977 establishments in the United Kingdom
Awards established in 1977